Uncle Toby or Uncle Tobys may refer to:
Uncle Toby (character), in the novel The Life and Opinions of Tristram Shandy, Gentleman by Laurence Sterne
Uncle Tobys, an Australian food manufacturing company which specialises in breakfast oat products
Uncle Toby's Super Series was a professional Australian Iron Man circuit that ran from 1989 to 2001
Uncle Tobys Hardcourts or Australian Hard Court Championships, a former professional tennis tournament established in 1938 and held until 2008